Hindnubben is a mountain on the border of Vågå Municipality and Lom Municipality in Innlandet county, Norway. The mountain is surrounded by several other notable mountains including Heranoshøi to the northwest, Glittertinden to the west, Stornubben and Nautgardstinden to the southwest, and Russlirundhøe to the south.

See also
List of mountains of Norway

References

Lom, Norway
Vågå
Mountains of Innlandet